The 6-Piece (六枚落ち rokumai-ochi) handicap in shogi has both of White's major pieces, the rook and the bishop, removed as well as their lances and knights. Thus, White is left with pawns, golds, and silvers.

Black has the usual setup of twenty pieces.

The handicap is a part of the official handicap system.

Openings

Ninth File Edge Attack

９筋攻め

First File Edge Attack

See also 

 Handicap (shogi)
 8-Piece handicap
 Shogi opening

References

Bibliography

 
  · translated from Shōgi Taikan by Yoshio Kimura
  · Rook & Lance, 2-Piece, 4-Piece, and 6-Piece  handicap games from 1981

External links
 Handicap Series: Six piece handicap by Larry Kaufman
 YouTube: How To Play Shogi (将棋): Lesson 25: Handicapped Games (1/2) by HIDETCHI from 7:15 to 9:04
 YouTube Japan Shogi Association by professional player Akira Nishio (西尾明):
 ６枚落ち講座 #1
 ６枚落ち講座 #2
 ６枚落ち講座 #3

Shogi openings
Handicap shogi openings